Ševlje is a village in the Municipality of Škofja Loka in the Upper Carniola region of Slovenia.

References

External links

Ševlje at Geopedia

Populated places in the Municipality of Škofja Loka